HMS Britomart was a Cherokee-class brig-sloop launched in 1808. She participated in the capture of several small privateers and merchant vessels. She was also at the bombardment of Algiers (1816). The Navy sold Britomart in 1819. She then entered mercantile service. She sailed to South America, Van Dieman's Land (VDL), and the Indian Ocean. She spent much of her time sailing between England and VDL, and between VDL and the Australian mainland. She foundered in 1839 on her way between Port Phillip and Hobart.

Royal Navy
Commander William Buckley Hunt commissioned Britomart in August 1808.

On 6 November 1809 Brudner, Radnean, master, which had been sailing from Reval to France, came into Yarmouth, a prize to Britomart. On 26 November Britomart captured Actief.

She took part in the ill-fated Walcheren Campaign of July–December 1809, and was one of a long list of ships who received prize money for property captured at Walcheren and adjacent islands in the Scheldt between 30 July and 16 August 1809, which was paid as the ships arrived at various ports from 6 October 1812.

In 1810, Britomart was stationed in the North Sea primarily off the Frisian Islands of Texel and Vlie to help enforce the naval blockade of that coast.

Britomart shared with Desiree in the proceeds of the capture on 5 January 1810 of Lynboom, Myden, master. That same day the two captured the American vessel Little Mary.

On 23 May 1810  captured Financier. Britomart claimed to share in the proceeds of the capture. Prize money was awarded in 1823.

On 29 May a cutting out expedition at Vlie with boats from Quebec, Desiree, Britomart, and  yielded a French lugger (12 guns), a French privateer (4), a Dutch gunboat, and a small rowboat. The British had no casualties; the French lost one man killed and three wounded.

Britomart recaptured Diligentia on 24 August.

Britomart and  shared in the proceeds of the capture on 2 September of the Danish vessels Goede   Verwagting and Frou Esje.

Britomart captured Dankbaarheit and Jonge Dirks on 11 March 1812.

Each of the British vessels launched a boat in pursuit. After a long chase Britomarts cutter and the boat from Osprey succeeded in catching up with their quarry. The French resisted forcefully and it took the British 10 minutes to reach the deck and another 10 minutes before the French struck. Éole was pierced for 14 guns but only mounted six. She had a crew of 31 under the command of Captain Dubost. She was one day out of Schiermonnkoog. In the attack Britomart had one man killed and five men wounded, and Osprey had one man killed and seven wounded. French casualties were two killed and seven wounded. Éole arrived at Yarmouth on 21 July.

Also in July Britomart participated in an attack on the batteries at Spikeroog, where she sustained a loss of one man killed and another wounded. On 26 July Britomart captured the French privateer Intrepid. Intrepid was armed with eight guns and had a crew of 40 men.

In August Britomarts  boats cut out two vessels from beneath the protection of 20 gun-boats in the river Ems.

On 30 August 1812 Britomart captured Amitie.

Commander Hunt died off Heligoland. His First Lieutenant, Charles Tulloh, assumed command and sailed Britomart to Yarmouth. When Tulloh arrived, Britomart was ordered to the Baltic to participate in conducting 17 Russian ships of the line to England.

Britomart underwent fitting at Sheerness. There Commander Robert Riddell assumed command on 8 December 1812. IN 1814 Britomart was on the Ireland station.

Britain and the Netherlands bombarded Algiers 27 August 1816 in an attempt to end the slavery practices of Omar Agha, the Dey of Algiers. An Anglo–Dutch naval force under the command of Admiral Edward Pellew, 1st Viscount Exmouth bombarded ships and the harbour defences of Algiers.

Britomart was among the smaller vessels that were present.

The bombardment was partially successful. After the bombardment the Dey freed around 3,000 slaves and signed a treaty ending the slavery of Europeans. In 1847 the Admiralty authorized the issue of the clasp "Algiers" to the Naval General Service Medal to the surviving claimants from the action.

Commander Riddell went on half pay on 15 November, but Commander Constantine Richard Moorsom had already taken command on 4 October. He left on 15 November and Commander George Perceval replaced him.

In 1818 Commander Bernard Yeoman assumed command of Britomart in 1818.

Disposal: The "Principal Officers and Commissioners of His Majesty's Navy" offered the "Britomart brig, of 238 tons", lying at Plymouth, for sale on 3 February 1819.  On that day G.Bailey purchased Britomart for £900 at Plymouth.

Mercantile service
Britomart first appeared in the Register of Shipping (RS) and in Lloyd's Register (LR) in 1821. On 1 September 1821 an advertisement appeared in The Times that Britomart, Daniel Peache, commander, would be beginning a regular packet service between London and Van Diemen's Land and New South Wales, and that she had room for only a few passengers. On 31 August 1823 Britomart was at Mauritius, preparing to sail for Cowes. She arrived back in England on 18 December with a cargo of cotton and sugar from Mauritius.

On 4 April 1827 Britomart, J.Brown, master, sailed for Mauritius.

Britomart left Mauritius on 14 August, the Cape on 20 September and St Helena on 5 October. She arrived at Deal on 2 December.

Under Captain Blake (see below), Britomart served as a transport, visiting Corfu on one voyage and Fernando Po on another. She left Fernando Po on 21 January 1829 with nine pirates that  had captured, and arrived at Deal on 1 April. She also sailed to the Bahamas. Not all of Britomarts voyages as a transport were mentioned n Newspapers. Still, in 1830 she carried a company of sappers to Gibraltar.

There are reports that between 1834 and 1836 Captain William MacDonald sailed Britomart between Hobart and the Australian mainland, particularly Sydney.

Fate
Britomart was wrecked on 22 December 1839 near Goose Island. She was on a voyage from Port Phillip to Hobart.

Lloyd's Register for 1840 has the annotation "missing" by her name.

Notes

Citations

References
 
 
 
 
 
 
 
 

1808 ships
Brigs of the Royal Navy
Age of Sail merchant ships of England
Maritime incidents in December 1839